Canchayllo District is one of thirty-four districts of the Jauja Province in Peru. Its seat is Canchayllo.

Geography 
The district lies in the Nor Yauyos-Cochas Landscape Reserve. The Paryaqaqa mountain range traverses the district. Other mountains are listed below:

Some of the largest lakes of the province are Antaqucha, Asulqucha, Challwaqucha, Llaksaqucha, Mankhaqucha, Qarwaqucha, Ñawinqucha, Warmiqucha, Wich'iqucha and Yuraqqucha.

See also 
 Quri Winchus

References